Martin Dimov (Bulgarian: Мартин Димов; born 1 March 1986) is a Bulgarian football manager and former footballer.

Career

Levski Sofia
In 2005, he was loaned by Levski Sofia to Rodopa Smolyan. In 2008, he returned to Levski Sofia. Back at the Gerena stadium, coaching staff were amazed by his performance and skills at his young age.

After an injury, Dimov played mainly for the second team during the 08/09 season.

Dimov became a Champion of Bulgaria in 2009, after a contradictory but great season under the coaching of Emil Velev. Despite the bad results during the autumnal part of the season, after great matches in the spring, Levski Sofia fulfilled the plan before the term had set and became a champion for 26 time, before the last round has been played. Dimov was a substitute the whole season.

On 9 June 2010 he returned to Levski, after a season out on loan.

Sportist Svoge
On 27 June 2009 it was announced that Dimov would be play on loan for FC Sportist Svoge during 2009/2010 season. As of the 2009/10 season, Martin capped 24 times for Sportist, scoring 1 goal. On 9 June 2010 he returned Levski.

Kaliakra Kavarna
On 8 July 2010 it became clear that Martin will continue his career in PFC Kaliakra Kavarna.

Tsarsko Selo Sofia
On 20 December 2016, Martin joined Tsarsko Selo.

Awards
  Champion of Bulgaria 2009

References

External links
 Dimov at Levski's site
 Profile at LevskiSofia.info

Bulgarian footballers
1986 births
Living people
First Professional Football League (Bulgaria) players
PFC Levski Sofia players
PFC Rodopa Smolyan players
FC Sportist Svoge players
PFC Kaliakra Kavarna players
Botev Plovdiv players
FC Montana players
FC Lyubimets players
FC Vitosha Bistritsa players
PFC Chernomorets Burgas players
FC Dunav Ruse players
FC Oborishte players
FC Botev Vratsa players
FC Tsarsko Selo Sofia players
Association football defenders